The 2003 World Weightlifting Championships were held in Vancouver, Canada from 14 November to 22 November. The men's 85 kilograms division was staged on 18 and 19 November 2003.

Schedule

Medalists

Records

Results

References
Weightlifting World Championships Seniors Statistics, Page 50 
Results 

2003 World Weightlifting Championships